The Worker-communist Party of Iran – Hekmatist is an opposition Iranian political party in exile. Its current secretary of central committee is Jamal Kamangar  and its current Chair of the Politburo is Siavash Daneshvar.

History
The WPI-Hekmatist was formed in 2004 after a major split from the Worker-communist Party of Iran (WPI).  More than half of the WPI's Central Committee and almost all of its Kurdistan Committee joined the WPI-Hekmatist.  The leadership of Worker-Communist Party of Iraq also supported this move and it is now the sister party of the WPI-Hekmatist. The other split was in 2012 under the same name Worker-Communist Party-Hekmatist.

The group claims to hold more closely to the line of Mansoor Hekmat, the WPI's founder, but this claim has been denied by the WPI leadership and the dispute between the two parties is still ongoing.
WPI-H denounce the WPI leadership as enacting a "retreat to the traditional Left" and the WPI leadership call the WPI-H "a right-wing split" and sometimes in sarcasm "Anti-Hekmatist" or more recently "UnHekmatist".

The Hekmatist party has declared it to be their goal to establish a modern Communist mass party in Iran and organize a Socialist revolution as Marx had formulated it. They distinguish themselves from other "traditional Left" groups by emphasizing their organization's focus on an immediate task (to the vanguard of the social movement for a Socialist revolution), rather than merely being an "intellectually-enlightning sectarian organization".

External links
WPI - Hekmatist Official website
Mansour Hekmat Official website
Marx-Hekmat Society Official website
Worker-communist Party of Iraq Official Website
WPI-H Kurdistan Committee Official website
Bikhodayan (Atheists Society) website
The Organisation for Emancipation of Woman Official website
The International Organization of Iranian Refugees Official Website
Children First Official website

Communist militant groups
Communist parties in Iran
Political parties established in 2004
Worker-communist parties
Banned communist parties
Banned political parties in Iran